Finney County Point of Rocks, near Mansfield, Kansas, was listed on the National Register of Historic Places in 2013.  It was a landmark on the Santa Fe Trail, in the section between the Lower and Upper Arkansas River crossings, before travelers had to choose between the Mountain Route or the Cimmaron Route of the trail.

References

External links

Natural features on the National Register of Historic Places in Kansas
Finney County, Kansas
Santa Fe Trail
Archaeological sites in Kansas